Sandager's wrasse (Coris sandeyeri) is a species of wrasse native to the southwestern Pacific Ocean from Australia to New Zealand and the Kermadec Islands. It can reach a length of  TL. It can also be found in the aquarium trade.

Behavior 
The wrasses live in small shoals consisting of one male and several 'attendant' females and juveniles. In the presence of the male, all juveniles will grow into females, but when the male dies or is removed from the shoal, the group's dominant female then undergoes physiological changes to convert herself into a male. (Greenwood. T., et al., 2012)

Sexual dimorphism 
The male fish has a deeper body, and differs significantly in colouration. For example, the male has very distinctive bands, whereas the female is paler in colour and only has 2 dark spots.(Greenwood. T. et al., 2012)

Note on Scientific Name
The difference between the spelling of the scientific name and the common name (the fish was named after Andreas Fleming Stewart Sandager, a lighthouse keeper in New Zealand who collected the first specimen) led to a proposal in 1927 to change the specific epithet to "sandageri" on the theory that the original description constituted a misspelling.  In 2011, it was shown that "Sandager" was also spelled "Sandeyer" at that time and thus that the original spelling should stand.

References 

 Greenwood. T., et al., (2012), OCR Biology A2 2012, Hamilton: Biozone International Ltd., pg. 155
 Tony Ayling & Geoffrey Cox, Collins Guide to the Sea Fishes of New Zealand,  (William Collins Publishers Ltd, Auckland, New Zealand 1982) 

Sandager's wrasse
Fish described in 1884